Stephanorhinus kirchbergensis, also known as Merck's rhinoceros or the forest rhinoceros, is an extinct species of rhino known from the Middle to Late Pleistocene of Eurasia. One of the last members of the genus Stephanorhinus, it is considered to be a typical component of the interglacial Palaeoloxodon large faunal assemblage in Europe. Among extant species of rhinoceroses it is most closely related to the Sumatran rhinoceros, while the well known woolly rhinoceros was another close relative. In the western part of its range, it was sympatric with Stephanorhinus hemitoechus.

Etymology and taxonomy 
The first part of the genus name is derived from that of King Stephen I of Hungary, and the second part from 'rhinos' (ρινος, meaning "nose"), as with Dicerorhinus. The species name was given by Georg Friedrich von Jäger in 1839 for Kirchberg an der Jagst in Baden-Württemberg, Germany where the type specimens had been found. It is often known in English (and equivalents in other languages) as Merck's rhinoceros after Carl Heinrich Merck, who gave the initial name to the species in 1784 as Rhinoceros incisivus, that is now considered a nomen oblitum, and who after a widely used junior synonym of the species, Rhinoceros/Dicerorhinus mercki (historically several alternate spellings) was named by Johann Jakob Kaup in 1841.

Description 
Merck's rhinoceros is considered to be large for a rhinoceros, with a particularly large specimen from Poland reaching an estimated height at the withers of 182 centimetres. The bones of the skeleton are robust and massive. The skull of Merck's rhinoceros is elongated, with the septum nasalis ossified only towards its anterior (front) end. The mandibular symphysis is relatively long and the mandible has a horizontal high, thick branch.

Dental anatomy 
The enamel of the teeth is very thick, and often bright coloured and smooth, with very thin or absent coronal cement. The buccal (cheek-facing) sides of the teeth often have sub-vertical bluish lines. Tooth dimensions are highly variable in comparison to other Stephanorhinus species. The upper teeth, especially the molars, are much higher towards the buccal side than to the lingual (towards the tongue) side. The ectolophs of the first and second upper molars have shallower folds, especially the fold between the paracone and mesostyle, than those of S. hemitoechus, resulting in a less pronounced undulation. In comparison to other species of Stephanorhinus, the premolars of S. kirchbergensis  are mesially (towards the front of the tooth) broad and relatively lingually short. The upper premolar ectoloph folds are shallow, and have narrow anterior valleys. The ectoloph curves strongly mesially and often distally (towards the hind portion of the tooth) towards the inside of the tooth. In both upper molars and premolars, the metalophs and the protolophs are distinctly bulbous. The lower premolars and molars are similar and hard to distinguish.

Origin 
The earliest definitive records are from Choukoutien Locality 13, in Fangshan District near Beijing at around the Early-Middle Pleistocene transition. Stephanorhinus yunchuchenensis from Shanxi, China, likely represents a junior synonym of S. kirchbergensis, its precise age is uncertain, but it has been suggested to date to the late Early Pleistocene. S. kirchbergensis appears in Europe during the early Middle Pleistocene between 0.7 and 0.6 million years ago, existing alongside the already present S. hundsheimensis. Mitochondrial and nuclear genomes obtained from a permafrost specimen and a dental proteome suggest that it is more closely related to the woolly rhinoceros than the Sumatran rhinoceros. A 2023 morphological study suggested its closest relative was the narrow-nosed rhinoceros (S. hemitoechus).

Range 

Its range spans from Europe to East Asia, but appears to be absent from the Iberian Peninsula.  It is presumed to have had a preference for closed forest and woodland habitats, as opposed the to open grassland habitats favoured by S. hemitoechus. Its range extended into the Arctic Circle, with a 70–48 thousand-year-old skull known from arctic Yakutia in the Chondon River valley and a late Middle Pleistocene aged lower jaw from the Yana River valley. Teeth are known from caves in Primorsky Krai , suggested to date between 50,000 and 25,000 years ago based on dates of other bones found in the deposit, which are the easternmost known records. A tooth of S. cf. kirchbergensis of an unknown age is known from the Lut Desert in eastern Iran. It is fairly common throughout the Pleistocene in North China, but is a rarer component of South Chinese assemblages, being known from around 30 localities in the region. Antoine (2012) states that D. choukoutienensis, D. lantianensis, and D. yunchuchenensis are local names for the taxon, without elaboration. Its range was strongly controlled by glacial cycles, with the species experiencing repeated cycles of expansion and contraction as the ice sheets advanced, this accounts for the relative rarity of its remains in comparison to the woolly rhinoceros. The species' range underwent significant reduction during the Last Glacial Period, with the youngest records from Italy being in Marine isotope stage (MIS) 4 and 3. Radiocarbon dated remains from the Altai date to around 40,000 years ago. The youngest reliable records in China are from the Rhino Cave in Hubei, which is early Late Pleistocene in age. Though less definitive remains are known from near Harbin in Heilongjiang, which are thought to be 20 kya in age. Records from Migong Cave just south of the Yangtze River in the Three Gorges area are suggested to date to MIS 2 (29,000-14,000 years ago).

Diet 
Merck's rhinoceros has been interpreted as primarily a browser, feeding on the branches and leaves of trees and shrubs. It had a more specialised diet than S. hundsheimensis and was clearly distinct from the grazing diet hypothesised for S. hemitoechus. Despite their morphological differences, dental wear analysis of several European S. kirchbergensis and S. hemitoechus populations were similar and indicative of mixed feeding, suggesting dietary convergence due to low habitat variability during the Pleistocene. Analysis of plant material embedded within teeth from the Neumark-Nord locality in Germany found remains of Populus (poplar or aspen) Quercus (oak), Crataegus (hawthorn), Pyracantha, Urtica (nettles) and Nymphaea (water lilies) as well as indeterminate remains of Betulaceae, Rosaceae, and Poaceae (grass). Preserved plant remains found with the teeth on the arctic Chondon skull included twigs of Salix (willow), Betula (birch) and abundant Larix (larch) alongside fragments of Ericaceae (heather); sedges were notably absent. A specimen from Eemian aged deposits in Gorzów Wielkopolski in Poland had twigs of Corylus (hazel), Carpinus (hornbeam), and Viscum (mistletoe), alongside fruit scales of birch, with hazel and birch dominating amongst the pollen. The pollen from a specimen found at Spinadesco in Italy was dominated (~50%) by trees, particularly Alnus (alder) and Fagus (beech), with Hippophae rhamnoides (sea buckthorn), dominating amongst the shrubs, with around 30% of the total contribution being from a variety of herbaceous plants.

Human exploitation 
At the Taubach travertine site in Thuringia, Germany, which dates to the Eemian (approximately 130,000-115,000 years ago) remains of Merck's rhinoceros with cut marks are known. The vast majority of remains were of young subadults, alongside a much smaller number of adults. It has been suggested that the rhinoceroses were killed and butchered on site by Neanderthals.

Gallery

References 

Pleistocene rhinoceroses
Prehistoric mammals of Europe
Pleistocene mammals of Asia